Agapanthia obydovi is a species of longhorn beetle in the subfamily Lamiinae found only in Kazakhstan.

References

obydovi
Beetles described in 2000
Endemic fauna of Kazakhstan
Beetles of Asia